Afeez is a given name. Notable people with the name include:

Afeez Agoro (born 1975), Nigerian model, actor, and reality television personality
Afeez Aremu (born 1999), Nigerian footballer
Afeez Awakan (born 1993), Nigerian footballer
Afeez Oyetoro (born 1963), Nigerian comic actor

Masculine given names